Cat Daddy Games is an American video game developer and a studio of 2K based in Kirkland, Washington. It was founded in the Seattle area by Ryan Haveson, Harley Howe, and Patrick Wilkinson after leaving Microsoft's games division in March 1996. During their time at Microsoft, they compiled a list of features they wanted to see in a game, and upon forming Cat Daddy Games, started developing Demon Isle, an action-adventure game. In Q2 2003, Cat Daddy Games was acquired by Take-Two Interactive and became an internal development studio for Take-Two's Global Star Software label. On September 10, 2007, Take-Two Interactive announced the opening of 2K Play, a new sub-label for its 2K division, which consumed all assets of Global Star Software, including Cat Daddy Games.

Games developed

References

External links 
 

1996 establishments in Washington (state)
2K (company)
American companies established in 1996
Companies based in Kirkland, Washington
Take-Two Interactive divisions and subsidiaries
Video game development companies